Salvatore Mastroieni  (5 March 1914 – 25 August 1996) was an Italian long-distance runner. He competed at the 1934 European Athletics Championships in the Men's 5000 metres and finished 5th. He was national champion in the 5000 metres that year. Two years later, he competed in the same event at the 1936 Summer Olympics in Berlin but finished 6th in Heat 3, narrowly missing the cut.

References

External links
 

Italian male long-distance runners
Olympic athletes of Italy
Athletes (track and field) at the 1936 Summer Olympics
1914 births
1996 deaths
Sportspeople from the Province of Messina